Federico De Robertis (born 5 June 1962) is an Italian musician, composer and record producer. De Robertis was born in Lucca, Tuscany. He composed the soundtrack for many movies by the Italian director Gabriele Salvatores, Puerto Escondido (1992), Nirvana (1995) and Siberian Education (2013), also for the Vanzina's Brothers.

Career

De Robertis started working on soundtracks in 1991 with the director Gabriele Salvatores, then with Carlo Vanzina, as well as others. In October 2011, he founded a music group, Fede & gli Infedeli, with which he performed several soundtracks and songs of his own composition.

In 2018, he authored a theme for the film Volare (film) directed by Gabriele Salvatores, and the same year he worked on the composition of the music for a multimedia art project on La rondine by Giacomo Puccini. The following year, as part of an event organized by Lucca Film Festival, the arrangements of the original music for Blade Runner composed by Vangelis. In 2020, he composed the original music for Italia Lockdown, a collective film edited by Salvatores.

Selected discography
Solo and Collaboration
Puerto Escondido (1992, soundtrack)
S.P.Q.R.: 2,000 and a Half Years Ago (1994, soundtrack)
I Don't Speak English (1995, soundtrack)
Nirvana (1995, soundtrack)
Selvaggi (1995, soundtrack)
Banzai (1997, soundtrack)
2061: An Exceptional Year (2007, soundtrack)
Siberian Education (2013)

Awards and acknowledgments

David di Donatello 
 1994 – Best soundtrack nomination for  Sud 
 1997 – Nomination for Best Score for  Nirvana 
 2015 – Nomination for Best Score for  The Invisible Boy

Silver Ribbons 
 1994 – Best soundtrack award for  Sud

Golden Ciak 
 1994 – soundtrack for  Sud

Golden Globe 
 1994 – soundtrack for  Sud

References

External links
 Fede & gli Infedeli official website

1962 births
Living people
Musicians from Lucca
Italian male singer-songwriters
Italian singer-songwriters
Italian composers
Italian male composers
Ciak d'oro winners